Tallinn–Tartu GP (before 2007, the E.O.S. Tallinn GP) was a single-day road bicycle race held annually in June in Tallinn, Estonia. From 2005 until 2012 the race was organized as a 1.1 event on the UCI Europe Tour. In 2008, Pro Cycling Club gave up organizing the E.O.S. Tallinn GP and race name was changed to Tallinn–Tartu GP, organized by Club Tartu Maraton. The race was discontinued in 2012, with the same course becoming the first stage of the Tour of Estonia instead.

Winners

External links
 Estonian Cycling Weekend
  

UCI Europe Tour races
Cycle races in Estonia
Recurring sporting events established in 2002
2002 establishments in Estonia
Summer events in Estonia
Defunct cycling races in Estonia
2012 disestablishments in Estonia
Recurring sporting events disestablished in 2012
Sports competitions in Tallinn
Sport in Tartu